The 1924 Auburn Tigers football team represented Auburn University in the 1924 college football season. It was the Tigers' 33rd overall season and they competed as a member of the Southern Conference (SoCon). The team was led by head coach Boozer Pitts, in his second year, and played their home games at Drake Field in Auburn, Alabama. They finished with a record of four wins, four losses and one tie (4–4–1 overall, 2–4–1 in the SoCon).

Schedule

Source: 1924 Auburn football schedule

References

Auburn
Auburn Tigers football seasons
Auburn Tigers football